The 1992 FA Charity Shield (also known as the Tennent's FA Charity Shield for sponsorship reasons) was the 70th Charity Shield, a football match contested by the winners of the previous season's Football League and FA Cup competitions. The match was played on 8 August 1992 between 1991–92 Football League champions Leeds United and 1991–92 FA Cup winners Liverpool.

Leeds won a dramatic match 4–3 with a hat-trick from Eric Cantona.

The match saw Liverpool player Paul Stewart make his debut for the club. It was also the first competitive game that goalkeeper David James, an unused substitute, was involved in for Liverpool.

Background
The FA Community Shield was founded in 1908 under its former name, the FA Charity Shield, and was initially contested between the top professional and amateur teams of each season. It was played between the Football League champions and FA Cup winners for the first time in 1921. Leeds United were appearing in the Charity Shield for the third time, having previously won one (1969) and lost one (1974), while Liverpool appeared in their eighteenth and had won thirteen, five of them shared, (1964, 1965, 1977, 1986, 1990) and lost four (1922, 1971, 1983, 1984).

The formation of a new top-tier division, the Premier League, in 1992 meant that Leeds were the last club to take part in the event as Football League champions. Wembley Stadium acted as the host of the Shield, but matches from 2001 were switched to the Millennium Stadium, while Wembley was being refurbished into a 90,000-capacity venue.

Match details

References

External links
Match report at LFCHistory.net

1992
Charity Shield 1992
Charity Shield 1992
Comm